Gottfried II (died 1183) was a German nobleman and member of the house of Sponheim. He succeeded his father Gottfried I as count at Sponheim and was succeeded by his son Gottfried III.

House of Sponheim
1183 deaths